KD (Kapal Diraja = Royal Ship) Rahmat  (pennant number F24) was a frigate operated by the Royal Malaysian Navy. The ship was ordered in 1966 as Hang Jebat.

Development
The design emphasised simplicity and economy but had an unusual machinery layout with a gas turbine and a diesel driving two propellers via a gearbox in a CODOG (Combined Diesel or Gas) arrangement.

The ship's design served as the basis for  built for the Thai Navy by Yarrows. KD Rahmat was also the first ship in the region to be fitted with surface-to-air missile system. The Sea Cat surface-to-air missile system was removed during a 1982 refit and was replaced by an additional 40 mm Bofors gun.

Originally configured as an anti-submarine warfare (ASW) frigate, the ship was also used as the navy's second training platform for commissioned officers and men after routine refit in 2000. To enhance its role as a training vessel and to provide more accommodation space for trainees, its weapons and sonar systems were removed during the refit. The ship was decommissioned in 2004 and handed over to the Perak government in 2008.

Fate
The ship was converted into a museum ship in Lumut in 2011. In June 2017, the ship developed a leak and started listing to port. The ship was floated back into position within a few days. In February 2018, the ship leaked again and listed to starboard. This time, the ship was deemed irrecoverable and turned to scrap by Oberjaya Engineering.

References

Sources
 Baker, A.D. The Naval Institute Guide to Combat Fleets of the World 1998–1999. Annapolis, Maryland: Naval Institute Press, 1998. .
 Gardiner, Robert and Stephen Chumbley. Conway's All The World's Fighting Ships 1947–1995. Annapolis, Maryland USA: Naval Institute Press, 1995. .
 Moore, John. Jane's Fighting Ships 1979–80. London: Jane's Yearbooks, 1979. .

Ships built on the River Clyde
1967 ships
Frigates of the Royal Malaysian Navy
Maritime incidents in 2017
Museum ships in Malaysia